Ali Zafar is a Pakistani singer-songwriter, model, actor, producer, screenwriter and painter. He has received five Lux Style Awards and a Filmfare Award nomination.

His song "Channo" topped music charts and earned him several awards for Best Music Album and Best Artist. His performance in the film Tere Bin Laden garnered critical appreciations and earned him several nominations in the Best Male Debut category, including Filmfare. 

Zafar has been voted "Sexiest Asian Man on the Planet" five times in a worldwide poll by the British newspaper, Eastern Eye. He won this poll in successive years between 2012 and 2014, and twice more in 2018 and 2019. In 2020, he was awarded the 'Pride of Performance' by the Pakistani government.

Indus Music Awards 
Zafar has won 3 awards in the categories of 'Best Debut Artist', 'Best Album' and 'Best Pop Artist'.

Lux Style Awards 
The Lux Style Awards is an annual Pakistani award ceremony. The awards celebrate "style" in the Pakistani entertainment industry. It is the oldest event dedicated to the nation's cinema, television, fashion, music, and film industries. Zafar has won six awards with three other nominations.

Galaxy Lollywood Awards 
Zafar has won five awards with three further nominations.

Asian Bollywood Music Awards 
Zafar has won an award for 'Best Pop Music Album in Pakistan'.

MTV Style Awards 
Zafar has won three awards in the categories of 'Best Male Artist', 'Most Stylish Artist' and 'Best Male Singer'.

Zee Cine Awards 
Zee Cine Award (also known as ZCA) is an awards ceremony for the Hindi film industry. They were instituted in November 1997 to award "Excellence in cinema – the democratic way".

Filmfare Awards 
The Filmfare Awards honour artistic and technical excellence in the Hindi-language film industry of India. The Filmfare ceremony is one of the most famous film events in India.

IIFA Awards 
The International Indian Film Academy Awards (also known as the IIFA Awards) are presented annually and honour both the artistic and technical excellence of professionals in Bollywood. Zafar has been nominated once.

Screen Awards 
The Screen Awards is an annual awards ceremony held in India honouring professional excellence in Bollywood. Zafar has been nominated once.

Style Awards 
Zafar has won an award and one nomination.

Stardust Awards 
The Stardust Awards was an award ceremony for Hindi movies, sponsored by Stardust magazine. Zafar has won an award with two nominations.

Pakistan Media Awards 
The Pakistan Media Awards (also known as The PMA) are awards given annually for achievements in radio, TV, film, and theatre. The award is a knight statuette with a star on its chest, officially named the Pakistan Media Award of Merit. Zafar has been nominated four times.

ARY Film Awards 
The ARY Film Awards (commonly known as The AFAs) is an annual Pakistani awards ceremony, honouring the cinematic achievements of the film industry. Winners are awarded the ARY Film Award of Merit (also known as the AFA trophy). The awards, first presented in Karachi in 2014, are overseen and organized by ARY Digital Network and Entertainment Channel. Zafar has won an award.

Hum Awards 
Hum Awards are annual accolades bestowed by the Hum Network Limited in recognition of excellence in television, fashion and music within Pakistan. Winners are awarded the Hum Award of Merit. The first award ceremony was held in 2013 at the Karachi Expo Centre. Zafar has been nominated once.

Karawood Film Festival

HT Most Stylish Awards

Hum Style Awards

International Pakistan Prestige Awards

Other awards and  honours

See also 
 List of awards and nominations received by Atif Aslam
 List of awards and nominations received by Rahat Fateh Ali Khan
 Ali Zafar discography

References 

Awards
Zafar, Ali